Difluprednate, sold under the brand name Durezol, is a corticosteroid used for the treatment of post-operative ocular inflammation and pain.

In was approved for medical use in the United States in June 2008. It is available as a generic medication.

Medical uses 
Difluprednate is indicated for the treatment of inflammation and pain associated with ocular surgery; and the treatment of endogenous anterior uveitis.

Clinical trials
Difluprednate ophthalmic emulsion 0.05% is also being studied in other ocular inflammatory diseases, including a phase 3 study evaluating difluprednate for the treatment of anterior uveitis

References

Corticosteroid esters
Organofluorides
Butyrate esters
Novartis brands
Acetate esters
Corticosteroids